The Eternal Idol may refer to: 
 The Eternal Idol, an album by Black Sabbath
 The Eternal Idol (statue), a statue by Auguste Rodin